Frederick Brown Simpson (6 November 1886 – 23 September 1939) was  a British Labour Party politician.

Born in Nottingham and in 1922 Simpson was elected to Leeds City Council as an alderman, and in 1931 was Lord Mayor of the city. He was a prominent trades unionist, and served as president of the Railway Clerks' Association from 1932 to 1937.
 
He was elected at the 1935 general election as Member of Parliament (MP) for Ashton-under-Lyne, defeating the Conservative MP John Broadbent by a majority of only 114 votes.

F B Simpson died suddenly while playing golf at Headingley, near Leeds in September 1939.He was cremated at Golders Green Crematorium.In the by-election for his seat the Labour candidate William Jowitt was returned unopposed.

References

External links 
 

1886 births
1939 deaths
Labour Party (UK) MPs for English constituencies
UK MPs 1935–1945
Lord Mayors of Leeds
Presidents of the Transport Salaried Staffs' Association
Transport Salaried Staffs' Association-sponsored MPs
Members of the Parliament of the United Kingdom for Ashton-under-Lyne